The Introduction is the first studio album by the guitarist Steve Morse, released in 1984 by Elektra/Musician. It reached No. 101 on the U.S. Billboard 200 and No. 15 on Billboard's Jazz Albums chart.

Track listing

Personnel

Steve Morse – guitar, synthesizer (except track 6), organ, production
Albert Lee – guitar (track 2)
T Lavitz – piano
Rod Morgenstein – drums, synthesizer (track 6)
Jerry Peek – bass
Chuck Allen – engineering, mixing
Tom Morris – engineering assistance
Jim Morris – engineering assistance 
Rick Miller – engineering assistance
Greg Calbi – mastering

Chart performance

References

External links
In Review: Steve Morse Band "The Introduction" at Guitar Nine Records

1984 debut albums
Steve Morse albums
Elektra/Musician albums
Albums recorded at Morrisound Recording